This is a list of composting systems:

Home composting (small-scale)
Bokashi (horticulture)
Composting toilet
Container composting
Ecuador composting method
Hot container composting
Hügelkultur a.k.a. German mound
Sheet mulching
Trench composting
Vermicomposting

Industrial composting (large-scale)

Aerated static pile composting, Tunnel composting
High fibre composting
In-vessel composting
Mechanical biological treatment
Vermicomposting
Windrow composting

See also

Agroecology
Biodynamic agriculture
Certified Naturally Grown
Compost
Intensive farming
Organic farming by country
Organic Farming Digest
Organic food
Organic movement
Permaculture
Plant nutrition
Seasonal food
Sustainable agriculture
San Francisco Mandatory Recycling and Composting Ordinance
Terra preta
Urban agriculture
Waste sorting
The Society for the Preservation of Wild Culture

Related lists
Index of environmental articles
Outline of organic gardening and farming
Outline of sustainable agriculture